Waldemar Korycki (born 11 August 1946) is a retired Polish sprinter who specialized in the 400 metres.

He was a successful relay runner. At the 1968 European Indoor Games he won a gold medal in the short relay and a silver medal in the medley relay. At the 1971 European Indoor Championships he won a gold medal in the 4 x 400 metres relay together with Jan Werner, Andrzej Badeński and Jan Balachowski. With the same team members he won a silver medal in the relay at the 1971 European Championships. The same team won the relay at the 1972 European Indoor Championships.

References

1946 births
Living people
Polish male sprinters
People from Drawsko County
European Athletics Championships medalists
Sportspeople from West Pomeranian Voivodeship
Zawisza Bydgoszcz athletes
20th-century Polish people